The  Warner Bros. Ranch is located at 411 North Hollywood Way in Burbank, California and was formerly called the Columbia Ranch. It was the backdrop for many Columbia Pictures films and Screen Gems/Columbia Pictures Television shows, including Father Knows Best, The Donna Reed Show, Dennis the Menace, Hazel, Bewitched, Gidget, I Dream of Jeannie, The Monkees, The Flying Nun, Here Come the Brides, The Partridge Family, The Hathaways, The Waltons, Lost Horizon, High Noon, Mr. Deeds Goes to Town, You Were Never Lovelier,  Lethal Weapon, National Lampoon's Christmas Vacation, WandaVision, The Wild One, The Wrecking Crew and Autumn Leaves. Only the front facades of the houses and buildings were built; the interiors were always shot at other locations or studios. The streets were constructed and arranged to allow shooting at multiple angles to create the illusion of a much larger area, though the lot only spans about six city blocks.

History
Columbia Pictures, with a limited amount of space at its Hollywood headquarters at Sunset and Gower, had been forced to rent neighboring movie studios' backlots for outdoor shooting. By the end of 1934, this problem was solved when studio head Harry Cohn acquired a  lot in Burbank at the corner of Hollywood Way and Oak Street, on what is said to have been the Burbank Motion Pictures Stables. The site was an ideal movie ranch as it was rural enough to be landscaped as the studio wished.

Columbia Pictures used the ranch as a backdrop for almost all of its outdoor scenes. Many television and film serials, such as Batman, Captain Midnight, Blondie and The Three Stooges, were filmed on the lot. In the 1960s, Columbia's television division Screen Gems used the ranch to film numerous shows.

In 1970, a catastrophic fire destroyed a quarter of the lot. Half of the Western set, the Colonial/European set and parts of the Blondie street burned, including the Blondie house (which was also used as the Father Knows Best home). Although the sets were quickly rebuilt, two additional fires destroyed much of the original features of the ranch, including New York Street, Modern Street and half of the Boston townhouses.

In 1972, Columbia and Warner Bros., both in financial trouble, entered into a joint venture to form The Burbank Studios on the site of the massive Warner lot, one mile south of the ranch.

In 1990, Columbia moved its production facilities to the historic Metro-Goldwyn-Mayer lot in Culver City. As a result, Warner Bros. gained ownership of the lot and renamed it Warner Ranch. The ranch, now containing additional soundstages, remains in use. Its permanent fountain in the park, built around 1935, was seen in the opening credits of Friends, as well as in Hocus Pocus, 1776, Bewitched, and various other television shows from the 1960s. 

The Ranch lot has served as the headquarters of Warner Bros. Animation since 2007

Demolition of sets & rebuild at Ranch

In 2019, Warner Bros. sold the Ranch property to Worthe Real Estate Group and Stockbridge Real Estate Fund as part of a larger deal to be completed in 2023 in time to mark its 100th anniversary. Per the deal, Warner Bros. will assume occupancy of the redeveloped parcel in 2025 following the transfer of ownership in 2023 and subsequent $500 million redevelopment led by Worthe.

The Ranch Friends fountain was moved to the WB main lot as part of its studio tour in 2022. 

The Blondie street homes and park featuring brownstone facades and swimming pool were to be leveled, paved for parking area, offices and 16 new stages as part of the lot remodel in 2022-2023. 

Another nearby campus has plans to include two office buildings built by Frank Gehry with WB as long-term tenants.

References

External links
The Unofficial Columbia Ranch site
Behind-the-scenes photos from the collection of Stephen Lodge, film industry crew member

Buildings and structures in Burbank, California
Movie ranches
Backlot sets
Ranches in California
1934 establishments in California